Alone with the Blues is a solo album recorded by American jazz pianist Ray Bryant in 1958 for the New Jazz label.

Reception

Scott Yanow, in his review for AllMusic states, "Ray Bryant's first solo piano album is rightfully considered a classic. Bryant, at the time thought of as a young modern traditionalist, has always felt perfectly at home playing the blues... highly recommended".

Track listing
All compositions by Ray Bryant except where noted.
 "Blues No. 3" – 7:15
 "Joy (Blues No. 2)" – 3:59
 "Lover Man" (Jimmy Davis, Ram Ramirez, Jimmy Sherman) – 3:52
 "Me and the Blues (Blues No. 1)" – 5:00
 "My Blues (Blues No. 5)" – 7:40
 "Rockin' Chair" (Hoagy Carmichael) – 5:16
 "Stocking Feet" – 4:47

Personnel 
Ray Bryant – piano

References 

1959 albums
Ray Bryant albums
New Jazz Records albums
Albums produced by Esmond Edwards
Albums recorded at Van Gelder Studio
Solo piano jazz albums